William or Bill Webb may refer to:

Politicians
 William Benning Webb (1825–1896), American politician and attorney
 William C. Webb (1824–1898), member of the Wisconsin State Assembly and the Kansas House of Representatives
 William George Webb (1843–1905), British Member of Parliament for Kingswinford, 1900–1905
 William Hoste Webb (1820–1890), Quebec lawyer and political figure
 William R. Webb (1842–1926), U.S. Senator from Tennessee
 William Wilson Webb (1826–1894), Ontario businessman and political figure
 William Webb (Victorian politician), MP in the Victorian Legislative Assembly from 1889 to 1904

Sports
 B. W. Webb (William Wilson Webb Jr., born 1990), American football cornerback
 William Webb (boxer) (1882–?), British Olympic bronze medal (1908) bantamweight boxer
 William Webb (rower) (1880–1960), New Zealand World Champion rower
 Bill Webb (pitcher) (1913–1994), Major League Baseball player
 Bill Webb (rugby union) (1868–c. 1931), Australian rugby union player
 Bill Webb (Australian footballer) (1883–1947), Australian rules footballer
 Bill Webb (second baseman) (1895–1943), Major League Baseball player
 William Earl Webb (1897–1965), Major League Baseball outfielder
 William Webb (cricketer, born 1872) (1872–1913), New Zealand cricketer
 William Webb (cricketer, born 1898) (1898–1969), English cricketer
 William Webb (diver), British Olympic diver

Musicians
 Boogie Bill Webb (1924–1990), American blues guitarist and singer
 Chick Webb (William Henry Webb, 1905–1939), American jazz and swing musician
 William Webb (composer) (c. 1600–1657), English musician and song composer

Others
 Sir William Webb (judge) (1887–1972), Australian judge
 William A. Webb (1824–1881), American Civil War sailor
 Suhaib Webb (William Webb, born 1972), American Islamic activist
 William Alfred Webb (1878–1936), American and Australian railway administrator
 William Frederick Webb (1829–1899), wealthy British land owner
 William H. Webb (1816–1899), American shipbuilder, naval architect, industrialist and philanthropist
 William James Webb (1830–1904), English painter 
 William J. Webb, Canadian egalitarian theologian known for his 'redemptive-movement' hermeneutic
 William Seward Webb (1851–1926), American doctor, financier, railroad president, and well-connected businessperson
 William Snyder Webb (1882–1964), American anthropologist
 William Trego Webb (1847–1934), educationist and author 
 William Walter Webb (1857–1933), American Episcopal bishop
 Bill Webb (game designer),  role-playing game designer
 William Webb (naturalist) (1834?–1897), Australian collector and trader of plants and animals
 William Webb (priest) (1825–1896), Archdeacon of Grenada
 William Webb (Master of Clare College, Cambridge) (1775–1856)

See also
 Billy Webb's Amazing Stories, CBBC mini-series
 William Webb Ellis (1806–1872), English Anglican clergyman; the man who is said to have invented rugby
 William Webb Follett (1796–1845), English lawyer
 William Webb Venable (1880–1948), U.S. Representative from Mississippi
 William Webbe (disambiguation)